Saint Augustine of Hippo (354–430), was a Church Father.

Augustine may also refer to:

People
 Augustine (actor) (1955–2013), Malayalam film actor
 Augustine of Canterbury (died 604), the first Archbishop of Canterbury
 Saint Augustine (disambiguation)
 Augustine (given name)
List of people with given name Augustine
 Augustine (surname), includes a list of people with the surname

Film

Augustine (film), a 2012 French film by Alice Winocour

Music

 "Augustine", a song by Patrick Wolf from The Magic Position

Places
 Augustine Volcano, a volcano on Augustine Island
 Augustine Heights, Queensland, a suburb in Ipswich, Australia
 Temple of the Augustinians, Brussels, a former Baroque-style church in Brussels, Belgium
 Les Augustins, a small group of rocks in the archipelago of Îles des Saintes, Caribbean Sea

Other uses

 Augustine Band of Cahuilla Indians
 Augustinians, Catholic monastic order
 Enchiridion of Augustine
 Luhring Augustine Gallery, an art gallery in Chelsea, New York
 Musée des Augustins, a fine arts museum in Toulouse, France
 Ulmus americana 'Augustine', a species of American Elm tree

See also
 
 Augustin (disambiguation)
 Agostinho (disambiguation)
 Agustin, a given name and surname
 Albert Augustine Ltd., originator of and currently a manufacturer of nylon classical guitar strings
 Augie (disambiguation)
 Augustine Commission (disambiguation)
 Augustinian (disambiguation)
 Augustinus (disambiguation)
 Saint-Augustin (disambiguation)
 Saint Augustine (disambiguation)